Southfields is a district of inner London located within the London Borough of Wandsworth, England, 5.6 miles (9 km) south-west of Charing Cross. Southfields is mainly residential, historically a part of Wandsworth itself, and is divided between the SW18 and SW19 postcode areas.

History

Until the late 19th century Southfields was still fields, situated between the more developed villages of Wimbledon and Putney. Several of the former pathways through the fields form the routes of parts of today's road system, in particular Wimbledon Park Road and its continuation through Southfields Passage, which was the field path from Wimbledon to Wandsworth, Kimber Road and The Baulk, both of which were field paths and can be seen on old maps of the area.

When the District & London & South Western Railway from Wimbledon to Putney Bridge opened in June 1889, the area started to take off, with the first school opening a year later on Merton Road, another of the main thoroughfares that were formerly paths through fields.

The area, like others around it, has undergone significant change in the last few decades, with house prices rising accordingly. The history of Southfields has been researched and documented in Neil Robson's 1999 book Roomy Villas.

The main residential areas of Southfields are the "Southfields Triangle" and "The Grid".

The "Southfields Triangle" is a series of roads and streets that (somewhat) resemble a triangle. It covers the area from Standen Road in the south (bordering on the historic Coronation Gardens) up to Granville Road in the north, and Pulborough Road in the west across to Merton Road in the east. The "Southfields Triangle" consists almost entirely of Victorian and Edwardian houses. In 1904, the Frame Foods babyfood company opened its factory in Standen Road. The building is in a distinctive art nouveau style, with green ceramic tiles and the slogan 'Nourish and Flourish' on the exterior. The building is Grade II listed and has been converted into luxury flats. Standen Road was also the home of the Ault & Wiborg printing ink factory, and is the only street in the area where the some homes with south-facing gardens border Coronation Gardens, giving them a calm, rural feel.

"The Grid" is a series of parallel roads that are crossed at right angles by a series of parallel streets – so named because of the grid layout of the streets. The roads run from Replingham Road, in the north to Revelstoke Road, in the south, and the streets run from Elsenham Street, in the west, to Astonville Street (although Merton Road to the east of Astonville is the border of "The Grid"). "The Grid" consists mostly of Edwardian terrace houses and purpose built maisonettes. Some houses have been converted into flats in the past, although conversions are no longer permitted on The Grid owing to a change in policy by Wandsworth Borough Council. These Victorian terraced houses were built at the same time as the bordering terraced housing Wimbledon Park and the avenues to the south of The Grid originally had the same names as the streets in Southfields that led to them. A restrictive covenant or covenants at one time prevented any pubs from being built in the Southfields "Grid" area. However, in the 1990s, the covenants were apparently judged either to be ineffective or non-existent and two pubs were opened in adjoining premises on the south side of Replingham Road (one since closed, in late 2011).

The building on the corner of Kimber Road and Merton Road once housed the OK Sauce factory, until its takeover by Reckitt and Colman court.

Toponymy

Southfields takes its name from the old manorial system, where it was known as the South Field of the manor of Dunsford. The earlier name for the area dates back at least to the year 1247.
The equivalent North Field lay between West Hill and the River Thames and survives in the short road named Northfields which runs to the east of Wandsworth Park.

Governance

Southfields is one of the 20 wards that make up the London Borough of Wandsworth, and it supplies three of the Borough Council's 60 councillors – the Conservative Party's Kim Caddy, Guy Humphries & Terry Walsh. It is part of the Merton and Wandsworth constituency for the London Assembly.

Southfields falls within the parliamentary constituency of Putney. The current Member of Parliament for the constituency is the Labour Party's Fleur Anderson, who was elected in 2019 with a majority of 4,774.

Geography

Southfield's postcodes are split across the London Boroughs of Wandsworth and Merton. Of the two main parks, the above applies to Wimbledon Park whilst the second, King George's Park is situated wholly within the boundaries of Wandsworth. Tennis being a part of the fabric of Southfields life, both parks are home to a large number of public tennis courts. Wimbledon Park has an athletic track and a landscaped lake that is home to a number of water sports. The smaller but historic Coronation Gardens bordering the southern edge of the Southfields triangle commemorates the coronation of King Edward VII in August 1902.

Demography

According to the 2011 census the ward of Southfields had a population of 17,962. The population of the area is largely white in its ethnic origins, at 75.6%.

The area is also home to a significant South African community, composed predominantly of young white immigrants who have left South Africa, for reasons of employment, career experience, money and travel, since finding employment at home became harder (following the introduction of Black Economic Empowerment).

Transport
The A3 trunk road runs south west towards Portsmouth and north east into central London along Southfields' northern edge; the district is bounded by the A218 (Merton Road) to the east and the A219 (Parkside Avenue) to the west.

Southfields is served by bus routes 39 (Clapham Junction to Putney Bridge, operated by London General), 493 (Tooting Broadway to Richmond, operated by London General) and 156 (Vauxhall to Wimbledon, operated by Abellio London).

Southfields tube station is in Travelcard Zone 3 of the London Underground network, situated between East Putney and Wimbledon Park on the Wimbledon branch of the District line. Southfields is the main London Underground station for the Wimbledon Tennis Championships. A five-minute walk takes spectators from Southfields Tube down Wimbledon Park Road to the All England Lawn Tennis and Croquet Club.

Southfields is not served by the National Rail network; the nearest National Rail stations are Earlsfield, Wimbledon and Putney.

Popular culture

Part of the video for Shampoo's 1994 hit single 'Trouble' was filmed in Southfields.

The former cinema premises on Wimbledon Park Road, most recently used as a snooker club were demolished following a successful planning application from the owners of the site, despite a three-year campaign by a local group to convert the building back to a local cinema, which would have been named The Southfields Plaza.

In 1926, Southfields became home to London's first mosque.  The Fazl Mosque, also known as the London Mosque, was built by the Ahmadiyya Muslim Community and served as the international headquarters of the community until 2019, when the headquarters moved to Farnham.

The band Lawson's debut album was named after Chapman Square SW19.

Notable people

Notes

References

External links
Southfields Village website
Borough history
Story of Wandsworth
Southfields Triangle Residents Association
Southfields Grid Residents Association
Southfields Community College
Wandsworth City Learning Centre (based in Southfields)

Districts of the London Borough of Wandsworth
Areas of London